Shahid Hajibabaei Stadium, is a Football Stadium located in Hamedan, Iran. It was opened on September 16, 2012 and has an all-seater seating capacity of 10,000.

References

Football venues in Iran
Buildings and structures in Hamadan Province
Sport in Hamadan Province